The dwarf lemurs are the lemurs of the genus Cheirogaleus. All of the species in this genus, like all other lemurs, are native to Madagascar.

Description 

Measuring 19–27 cm in body length with a tail about 16–17 cm, they are larger than the mouse lemur but smaller than the gentle lemur.  Their heads are globular compared to the fox-like heads of the lemurs, but their muzzles are more pointed than those of the hapalemurs.  Their hind limbs are slightly longer than their forelimbs, but not as elongated as in lepilemurs or indriids.  Dwarf lemurs have an intermembral index of 71 on average.  In contrast to most other primates, their grip is similar to that of South American monkeys with objects picked up and branches grasped between the second and third fingers, rather than between the thumb and index finger.  Their nails are somewhat keeled and pointed.

Dwarf lemurs roam the lower strata of the foliage in the coastal forests of eastern Madagascar.  They are nocturnal and quadrupeds.  They have a period of inactivity (torpor) during the winter season lasting between four and five months.  Their tail serves as an area for fat storage, most of which is consumed during periods of food scarcity.  Like most nocturnal prosimians, dwarf lemurs are reported as living solitary or in pairs.  They nest in tree holes where they often sleep together in curled up positions.  Their territories are marked by fecal and scent markings.  Their diet consists primarily of fruits and flowers and they seem to play a part in the pollination of certain plants.

Classification 
, 10 species are known.

 Genus Cheirogaleus: dwarf lemurs
 Montagne d'Ambre dwarf lemur, Cheirogaleus andysabini
 Furry-eared dwarf lemur, Cheirogaleus crossleyi
 Groves' dwarf lemur, Cheirogaleus grovesi
 Lavasoa dwarf lemur, Cheirogaleus lavasoensis
 Greater dwarf lemur, Cheirogaleus major
 Fat-tailed dwarf lemur, Cheirogaleus medius
 Lesser iron-gray dwarf lemur, Cheirogaleus minusculus
 Ankarana dwarf lemur, Cheirogaleus shethi
 Sibree's dwarf lemur, Cheirogaleus sibreei
 Thomas' dwarf lemur, Cheirogaleus thomasi

See also 

 List of lemur species
 List of mammals of Madagascar

References

Dwarf lemurs